, better known by her stage name , is a Japanese actress and voice actress. She was previously represented by Aoni Production, then Production Baobab, but is now freelance. Her son is Sunrise animator .

She is best known for the roles of Nobita Nobi (Doraemon), all of the female lead villains in the Time Bokan series (including Doronjo in both the original Yatterman and its remake), Conan (Future Boy Conan), Peter (Heidi, Girl of the Alps), Penelope Pitstop (Wacky Races), Oyuki (Urusei Yatsura), and Claudia LaSalle (Super Dimension Fortress Macross).

In the first ever Seiyu Awards in 2007, she won the Achievement Award. In the 7th Seiyu Awards in 2013, she won the Synergy Award for maximizing the appeal of voice-acting in a work as a whole.

Filmography

Television animation
 Attack No. 1 (1969) (Cathy)
 Sazae-san (1969) (Kōichi Ishida)

Andersen Stories (1971) (Ferone the Ice Maiden)
 Calimero (1972) Giuliano)
 Doraemon (1973) (Tamako Nobi)
 Wansa-kun (1973) (Wansa)
 Alps no Shōjo Heidi (1974) (Peter)
 La Seine no Hoshi (1975) (Catherine)
 Time Bokan series (1975) (Maajo, Doronjo, Muujo, Ataasha, Mirenjo, Munmun, Yanyan, Ruuju)
 Chōdenji Machine Voltes V (1977) (Hiyoshi Gō)
 Yatterman (1977) (Doronjo)
 Nobody's Boy: Remi (1978) (Mattia)
 Future Boy Conan (1978) (Conan)
 Space Battleship Yamato II (1978) (Sabera, Jiro Shima)
 Space Pirate Captain Harlock (1978) (Mime)
 Starzinger (1978) (Beramis)
 Doraemon (1979) (Nobita Nobi, Nobisuke Nobi (child)) 
 Urusei Yatsura (1981) (Oyuki) 
 Tokimeki Tonight (1982) (Shiira Eto)
 The Super Dimension Fortress Macross (1982) (Claudia LaSalle, Narrator) 
 Crusher Joe (1983) (Ricky) 
 Genesis Climber Mospeada (1983) (Refless) 
 Soreike! Anpanman (1988) (Black Rose Queen, Snow Queen) 
 Yatterman Night (2015) (Doronjo)

Theatrical animation
 The Great Adventure of Horus, Prince of the Sun (1968) (Chiro the Squirrel)
 Do It! Yasuji's Pornorama (1971)
 Urusei Yatsura: Only You (1983) (Oyuki)
 Urusei Yatsura 3: Remember My Love (1985) (Oyuki)
 Urusei Yatsura: The Final Chapter (1988) (Oyuki)
 Urusei Yatsura: Always My Darling (1991) (Oyuki)
 Doraemon: A Grandmother's Recollections (2000) (Nobita Nobi)

Original video animation
 Kaze to Ki no Uta: Sanctus (1987) (Serge Battour)
 Urusei Yatsura: Inaba the Dreammaker (1987) (Oyuki)
 Urusei Yatsura: Raging Sherbet (1988) (Oyuki)
 Crusher Joe: The Ice Prison (1989) (Ricky) 
 Crusher Joe: The Ultimate Weapon: Ash (1989) (Ricky) 
 Doraemon: Nobita to Mirai Note (1994) (Nobita Nobi)
 Urusei Yatsura: The Obstacle Course Swim Meet (2010) (Oyuki)

Television drama
 Doraemon Haha ni Naru: Ōyama Nobuyo Monogatari (2015) (Nobita Nobi, Narrator)

Video games
 Gunbird (Rouge)
 Gunbird 2 (Shark)
 Tatsunoko vs. Capcom (Doronjo)

Dubbing

Live-action 
Frankenstein's Army (Sacha (Luke Newberry))
Frankenstein Created Woman (1970 TV Asahi edition) (Christina Kleve (Susan Denberg))
Seven Golden Men (1982 TV Tokyo edition) (Giorgia (Rossana Podestà))

Animation 
Josie and the Pussycats (Valerie Brown)
The Perils of Penelope Pitstop (Penelope Pitstop)
The Rescuers (Miss Bianca)
Wacky Races (Penelope Pitstop)

References

External links
  
 Official agency profile 
 
 
 

1935 births
Living people
Aoni Production voice actors
Japanese child actresses
Japanese video game actresses
Japanese voice actresses
Production Baobab voice actors
Voice actresses from Tokyo
81 Produce voice actors